Carl Medjani (born 15 May 1985) is a professional footballer who plays as a central defender or defensive midfielder. He spent most of his career in France, his country of birth, while representing the Algeria national team at international level.

Club career

Liverpool
After spending his youth development years at Saint-Étienne he was signed by Liverpool's manager Gérard Houllier in August 2003. Liverpool beat off stiff competition from Premiership rivals Arsenal, Manchester United and German giants Bayern Munich to secure his services. In an interview with L'Équipe, Medjani revealed he left Saint-Étienne because he was willing to stay if given an opportunity with the first team but his request was turned down by Manager Frédéric Antonetti.

Medjani then struggled to break in Liverpool first team so he was sent on loan to Lorient for the whole 2004–05 season by new Liverpool manager Rafael Benítez, where he made 25 appearances. Despite impressing in the Toulon under-20 tournament in summer 2005, Benítez deemed it necessary for him to gain more experience and so he spent 2005–06 on loan at Metz.

Lorient
At the start of the 2006–07 season, he rejoined Lorient, this time on a permanent basis.

Ajaccio
In the 2007–08 season, Medjani moved down to Ligue 2 joining Ajaccio for the remainder of the season. 
 
The 2008–09 season earned Medjani a permanent move with the club on a three-year deal. He soon made an immediate impact when he scored his first goal in the second round of Coupe de la Ligue during Ajaccio's 4–2 loss against Montpellier. On 20 February 2009, Medjani came on as a substitute in the second half and 18 minutes into the game, he was sent off, along with Brahim Ferradj in the same minute, as Ajaccio drew 1–1 with Brest. Medjani scored his first league goal of the season during Ajaccio's 3–1 defeat to Strasbourg.

Following the 2009–10 season and the World Cup, Medjani was linked with Ligue 2 side Nantes. Ajaccio finished as runners-up in Ligue 2 resulting in their promotion to Ligue 1. Medjani signed a two-year contract extension until 2013. In the 2011–12 season, Medjani continued to be in the first team, either playing in centre back and defensive midfield. Medjani scored his first goal in a 3–1 loss against Paris Saint-Germain on 16 October 2011. On 10 December 2012, Medjani made a mistake in the final minutes, allowing Daniel Niculae to score in a 2–2 draw against Nancy, in a match which could have ended Ajaccio thirteen games without winning. In April, he scored his second goal of the season, in a 1–1 draw against Saint-Étienne.

Ahead of the 2012–13 season, Medjani expressed his desire to leave the club. In December, Medjani started to wear the captain's armband.

Monaco
In January 2013, just prior to the closing of the transfer window, Medjani joined Monaco on a three and a half year contract from Ajaccio.

Following Monaco promotion, Medjani was told by Manager Claudio Ranieri that his first team appearances would be limited following the club's spending spree.

Loan spells
In July 2013, Medjani was sent out on loan to Olympiacos from Monaco until 1 January 2014, with the option of a permanent move. After six months with few appearances at Olympiacos, he returned to his parent club.

Upon his return to France, Monaco then loaned him out to Valenciennes till the end of 2013–14 season.

Following his loan spell at Valenciennes, his time at Monaco came to an end despite having two years of his contract left.

Trabzonspor
After leaving Monaco, Medjani was linked with a move to Trabzonspor and Cagliari Calcio before joining Trabzonspor on a three-year contract. He scored his first goal for the club in the play-off round of the Europa League as Trabzonspor beat Rostov 2–0 in the first leg.

Levante and Leganés
On 30 January 2016, La Liga side Levante UD have signed Medjani until the end of the season, with an option to extend the contract for another season. On 25 July, after suffering relegation, he signed a one-year contract with CD Leganés also in the main category.

On 9 January 2017, Medjani rescinded with Lega and signed with Trabzonspor again.

International career

Medjani has an Algerian father and a French mother, and was eligible for both national teams. Medjani captained the France U21 team in the Toulon Tournament of 2006.

However, being of Algerian origin, he made the switch to represent Algeria in international competitions and was called up by Rabah Saâdane to the Algeria national team's preliminary squad for the 2010 FIFA World Cup, before going on to make the full tournament squad.

On 10 December 2012, it was announced that Medjani was selected in the 40-man provisional squad for the 2013 Africa Cup of Nations. Medjani survived the cuts, firstly to the 24-man list announced on 18 December 2012, and then to the final squad of twenty-three.

Having won 25 caps by this point, Medjani made his second FIFA World Cup squad by winning a place in the Algerian cohort for the 2014 FIFA World Cup. A year and ten appearances later, Medjani joined the Algeria team at the 2015 Africa Cup of Nations.

Personal life
While growing up, Medjani revered boxer Muhammad Ali.

Career statistics

Club

International goals
Scores and results list Algeria's goal tally first, score column indicates score after each Medjani goal.

References

1985 births
Living people
Footballers from Lyon
Association football defenders
Association football midfielders
French footballers
French sportspeople of Algerian descent
French expatriate sportspeople in Spain
Algerian expatriate sportspeople in Monaco
Algerian footballers
Algeria international footballers
France under-21 international footballers
French people of Kabyle descent
Kabyle people
Algerian expatriate footballers
Expatriate footballers in Greece
Expatriate footballers in Spain
Expatriate footballers in Turkey
Expatriate footballers in Saudi Arabia
FC Metz players
FC Lorient players
AC Ajaccio players
AS Monaco FC players
Liverpool F.C. players
Olympiacos F.C. players
Valenciennes FC players
Trabzonspor footballers
Levante UD footballers
CD Leganés players
Sivasspor footballers
Ohod Club players
Ligue 1 players
Ligue 2 players
Super League Greece players
Süper Lig players
Saudi Professional League players
La Liga players
2010 FIFA World Cup players
2013 Africa Cup of Nations players
2014 FIFA World Cup players
Algerian people of French descent
France youth international footballers
2015 Africa Cup of Nations players
Algerian expatriate sportspeople in Spain
Algerian expatriate sportspeople in Greece
Algerian expatriate sportspeople in Turkey
Algerian expatriate sportspeople in Saudi Arabia